Tommy McConville (19 March 1946 – 25 October 2013) was an Irish professional footballer.

Career
McConville was put on the transfer list in September 1974. He earned his first international cap for the Republic of Ireland national football team on 10 October 1971 in a 6–0 defeat to Austria.

Honours
League of Ireland: 4
 Waterford F.C. - 1972–73,
 Dundalk F.C. - 1975–76, 1978–79, 1981–82
FAI Cup: 3
 Dundalk F.C. - 1977, 1979, 1981
League of Ireland Cup: 2
 Dundalk F.C. - 1977–78, 1980–81
League of Ireland Shield:
 Dundalk F.C. - 1971-72
Leinster Senior Cup: 2
 Dundalk F.C. - 1976–77, 1977–78
President's Cup: 3
 Dundalk F.C. - 1979–80, 1980–81, 1981–82

References

1946 births
2013 deaths
Republic of Ireland association footballers
Republic of Ireland international footballers
Association football defenders
League of Ireland players
League of Ireland XI players
Dundalk F.C. players
Waterford F.C. players
Shamrock Rovers F.C. players
Finn Harps F.C. players
League of Ireland managers
People from Dundalk
Bangor F.C. players
NIFL Premiership players
Association footballers from County Louth
North American Soccer League (1968–1984) players
Washington Diplomats (NASL) players
Republic of Ireland football managers